

Hans-Wolfgang Reinhard (11 December 1888 – 6 October 1950) was a German general in the Wehrmacht during World War II. He was a recipient of the Knight's Cross of the Iron Cross of Nazi Germany.

Awards and decorations

 Knight's Cross of the Iron Cross on 22 September 1941 as General der Infanterie and commander of LI Army Corps

References

Citations

Bibliography

 

1888 births
1950 deaths
Generals of Infantry (Wehrmacht)
German Army personnel of World War I
Recipients of the clasp to the Iron Cross, 1st class
Recipients of the Knight's Cross of the Iron Cross
People from Hohenstein-Ernstthal
People from the Kingdom of Saxony
Reichswehr personnel
Military personnel from Saxony
German Army generals of World War II